Botesbánya is the Hungarian name for two places in Romania:

 Ştefan cel Mare Commune, Bacău County
 Valea Seacă village, Râciu Commune, Mureș County